Kealan Patrick Burke (born in Dungarvan, Ireland) is an author. Some of his works include the novels Kin, Currency of Souls, Master of the Moors, and The Hides (Bram Stoker Award nominee), the novellas The Turtle Boy (Bram Stoker Award Winner, 2004) and Vessels, and the collections Ravenous Ghosts, The Number 121 to Pennsylvania & Others, Theater Macabre and The Novellas. He has also appeared in a number of publications, including Postscripts, Cemetery Dance, Grave Tales, Shivers II, Shivers III, Shivers IV, Looking Glass, Masques V, Subterranean #1, Evermore, Inhuman, Horror World,  Surreal Magazine, and Corpse Blossoms. Burke also edited the anthologies: Taverns of the Dead (recipient of a starred review in Publishers Weekly), Brimstone Turnpike, Quietly Now: A Tribute to Charles L. Grant (International Horror Guild Award Nominee, 2004), the charity anthology Tales from the Gorezone and Night Visions 12.

In 2008 an 8-minute short film based on his short story "Peekers" was written by author Rick Hautala, and was directed by Mark Steensland. In 2009 Burke played the lead in the Independent film "Slime City Massacre", alongside Debbie Rochon. Burke won Best Actor at the 2010 PollyGrind Film Festival with his portrayal of Cory. In 2013 a feature film adaptation of "Peekers" was announced in development with Lionsgate Entertainment, written by Mike Flanagan and Jeff Howard ("Oculus", "Soma") and produced by Lawrence Grey.

See also
List of horror fiction authors

References

External links
Kealan Patrick Burke's official website.
Mr. Burke's "wovel" The Living
Lionsgate Buys Peekers Pitch

1976 births
Living people
People from Dungarvan
Irish male novelists